The Gate is a 2015 limited-edition live album by American experimental rock band Swans. The album was released on October 1, 2015 on band leader Michael Gira's Young God Records. Limited to 2500 copies, the album served as a fundraiser for The Glowing Man.

Background
The Gate was offered in a double-CD format. The album features six live recordings, with four of them being previously unreleased tracks set to be included in the next studio album. The other two recordings are the live versions of "A Little God in My Hands" and "Just a Little Boy," both from Swans' 2014 album, To Be Kind. The album additionally includes five "rough, crudely recorded demos," that will be re-recorded for the upcoming album.

The album also includes a DVD documentary on Swans' To Be Kind tour. Similar to the previous fundraising live albums, each CD copy came with a personalized cover art by the band, featuring a  cardboard cover drawn by Michael Gira.

Critical reception

In her review of the album for PopMatters, Natasha Gatian wrote, "It lacks some of the momentum and surprise of Swans’ studio work, but then, that’s one of the possible pitfalls of a live album. Diehards will appreciate hearing Swans in the wild, but casual fans might be better off sticking with album cuts before crossing The Gate’s imposing threshold."

Track listing

Personnel
Michael Gira – guitar, vocals
Christoph Hahn – double lap steel guitar, guitar
Thor Harris – drums, percussion, vibes, clarinet, melodica, violin, Gizmos
Christopher Pravdica – bass guitar, Gizmos
Phil Puleo – drums, Appalachian dulcimer, Gizmos
Norman Westberg – guitar

References

External links
 The Gate on Young God Records

2015 live albums
Swans (band) live albums
Young God Records live albums
Crowdfunded albums
Albums produced by Michael Gira